Anatoly Ilyich Kononenko (born February 21, 1935, in Rostov-on-Don) is a Soviet sprint canoer who competed in the early 1960s. At the 1960 Summer Olympics in Rome, he finished fifth in the K-1 4 × 500 m event.

References

External links
 

1935 births
Canoeists at the 1960 Summer Olympics
Living people
Olympic canoeists of the Soviet Union
Soviet male canoeists
Sportspeople from Rostov-on-Don